Rhacognathus is a genus of stink bugs (family Pentatomidae).

Species
 Rhacognathus americanus Stål, 1870 
 Rhacognathus callosus Horváth, 1903 
 Rhacognathus corniger Hsiao & Cheng, 1977 
 Rhacognathus punctatus (Linnaeus, 1758) - Heather Bug

References 

 Biolib

Asopinae
Pentatomidae genera
Pentatomomorpha genera